Arlo E. Schmidt (September 6, 1931 – November 30, 2022) was a North Dakota Democratic-NPL Party member of the North Dakota House of Representatives, representing the 7th district from 1995 to 2010.

Schmidt served in the United States Army and was an auctioneer. He died at his home in Northwood on November 30, 2022, aged 91.

References

External links
North Dakota Legislative Assembly - Representative Arlo Schmidt official ND Senate website
Project Vote Smart - Representative Arlo E. Schmidt (ND) profile
Follow the Money - Arlo Schmidt
2006 2002 2000 1998 campaign contributions
North Dakota Democratic-NPL Party - Representative Arlo Schmidt profile

1931 births
2022 deaths
American auctioneers
Democratic Party members of the North Dakota House of Representatives
Military personnel from North Dakota
People from Grand Forks County, North Dakota
People from Wells County, North Dakota